Carroll W. Ridgway (1900–1990) was an American football coach in the United States.

Coaching career
Ridgway was the head college football coach for the Baker Wildcats located in Baldwin City, Kansas. He held that position for the 1938 and 1939 seasons.  His coaching record at Baker was 5 wins, 11 losses and 2 ties. As of the conclusion of the 2012 season, this ranks him #14 at Baker in total wins and #18 at the school in winning percentage.

References 

Baker Wildcats football coaches
1900 births
1990 deaths